Sigma Hydrids are faint, minor meteor shower with peak on 9 December. ZHR is 3-5 and population index is 3. They are active from December 3 to 20.

Sigma hydrids were discovered by Richard E. McCrosky and Annette Posen.

References 

 

Meteor showers
December events
Hydra (constellation)